The Supermarine Sea Otter was an amphibious aircraft designed and built by the British aircraft manufacturer Supermarine. It was the final biplane flying boat to be designed by Supermarine; it was also the last biplane to enter service with both the Royal Navy and the Royal Air Force (RAF).

The Sea Otter was developed as a refinement of the Supermarine Walrus, having been redesigned for longer range operations, to perform dive bombing and to operate from a wider range of vessels than its predecessor. Prior to receiving the name Sea Otter, it was known as Stingray. Due to Supermarine's existing commitments to the Walrus and the Supermarine Spitfire programmes, the aircraft's development was protracted. The maiden flight of the Sea Otter took place on 23 September 1938, while a production order was only issued in 1942 on account of the urgent wartime demands of the Second World War.

Upon its introduction during the latter years of the conflict, the Sea Otter was primarily tasked with maritime patrol and air-sea rescue duties by both the RAF and the Royal Navy. Following the end of the conflict, numerous other operators procured the type for their own purposes; amongst these were the Royal Danish Air Force, Dutch Naval Aviation Service, and the Royal Australian Navy. Supermarine also undertook the conversion of surplus Sea Otters to a civilian configuration, leading to its use by civil operators as well.

Design and development

Background
The origins of the Sea Otter can be traced back to the earlier Supermarine Walrus. Even prior to the Walrus's maiden flight, the company's design team, headed by the aeronautical engineer R. J. Mitchell, were working on an improved version that was powered by either Bristol Aquila and Bristol Perseus radial engines. During February 1936, Mitchell approached the Air Ministry's Director of Technical Development to determine desirable performance attributes in the tentative aircraft prior to the detailed design commencing; from these discussions, it was decided to pursue a dive bombing capability, an elevated loaded weight, longer range, and for it to be fitted with equipment for operating from both aircraft carriers and cruisers.

On 17 April 1936, following Supermarine's submission of technical details, including detailed drawings and costings, the Air Ministry issued instructions to proceed with a pair of prototypes. Progress on these two prototypes was relatively slow, having been impacted by ongoing production commitments associated with both the Walrus and the Supermarine Spitfire programmes. The most visible difference between the Walrus and the Sea Otter was in the mounting of the powerplant; while the Walrus had a rear-facing engine with a pusher propeller, the Sea Otter's engine faced forward with a tractor propeller. In general, the exterior of the Sea Otter was cleaner than that of the Walrus, particularly in its engine arrangement, having disposed of the offset engine alignment to counteract torque by handling this via the vertical stabiliser instead.

Into flight
On 23 September 1938, the first prototype, K8854, performed the type's maiden flight, piloted by Supermarine's chief test pilot George Pickering. During the first flight, it was quickly determined that the original two-blade wooden propeller was inadequate, thus it was replaced by a three-blade counterpart produced by de Havilland, although this also failed to produce entirely satisfactory results. Again, the propeller was changed, this time to a four-bladed unit of which the pairs of blades were unusually set at an angle of 35° instead of the usual 90° so that the aircraft could be more easily moved within shipborne hangars and other enclosed areas.

Prior to the prototype's third flight, the aircraft had been named Stingray, but it was decided to rename it Sea Otter instead. Pickering observed its performance was noticeably better on the third flight, particularly during takeoff. Over following flights, only minor defects were identified and promptly resolved. During February 1939, sea recovery trials commenced from HMS Pegasus, resulting in some deviations being made from the standard practices used for deploying the earlier Walrus. The Admiralty also requested some changes, including that the nose be reprofiled as to reduce its water-spray tendencies as well as the installation of a three-blade Rotol constant speed propeller. Five months later, catapult trials involving HMS Pegasus were conducted, while general seaworthiness trials started during September 1939, although these were performed at Southampton on account of fears of German attacks upon Felixstowe.

On 26 January 1940, a high-level technical delegation visited Supermarine, announcing their decision to order the Sea Otter into production. This outcome came with the stipulation that the aircraft needed to be capable of landing at a lower speed; this was achieved via alterations to the wings. Other requested alterations included the addition of a nose-mounted Vickers K machine gun and greater headroom on the flight deck. While a contract for 190 Sea Otters was issued to Blackburn Aircraft later that year, where it was intended to produce the type under licence, the company was unable to accommodate this workload due to multiple other contracts, leading to the contract's cancellation in 1941.

Into production
Accordingly, it was until January 1942 that the Air Ministry placed a production order for the Sea Otter with Saunders-Roe, who had previously manufactured the Walrus as well. Due to cooling troubles found with the Perseus engine, the powerplant was changed for production aircraft to the Bristol Mercury XXX engine, which drove a three-bladed propeller. The first production Sea Otter, piloted by Jeffrey Quill, performed its first flight during January 1943. It was promptly transferred to RAF Worthy Down for its initial flight trials, and subsequently to Helensburgh for further water handling trials. Several minor alterations, including an elongated water rudder and a sting-type arrestor hook, occurred around this time.

Of the 592 aircraft that were at one point on order, only 292 Sea Otters were constructed. This was largely due to type's production run being disrupted by limited production capacity and by a sharp reduction in military demand following Victory in Europe Day and the end of the conflict.

During the postwar era, a large number of Sea Otters were converted for civilian use. The cabin was soundproofed and furnished with heating systems. In the cabin, seating for four passengers, a chemical toilet and a stowage area for baggage were provided. As they were intended for use as bush airplanes in remote areas, versatility was an important aspect; to allow cargo to be carried, the cabin floor was strengthened and fitted with lashing points, and the passenger seats made easily removable.

Operational history

During November 1944, the Sea Otter was introduced to operational service; by the time that the type was inducted by its fourth squadron, the Second World War had come to a close. The aircraft was primarily operated by both the RAF and the Royal Navy for both air-sea rescue and maritime patrol roles. While naval reconnaissance missions was the principal mission that the aircraft performed, the Sea Otter proved to be superior to its Walrus predecessor in the secondary role of retrieving downed aircrews. This role comprised a major portion of the Sea Otter's postwar activities into the 1950s.

On 19 July 1950, Lieutenant P. Cane, flying a Sea Otter from HMS Triumph (R16), performed the last operational sea rescue of that type, when a F4U Corsair had been shot down by anti-aircraft fire, forcing the American pilot to ditch into very rough seas. The Sea Otter landed despite the adverse conditions and the American pilot was soon rescued. The Sea Otter returned to Triumph successfully, thanks mainly to the skill of the pilot, who was awarded the US Air Medal as a result. 

Various overseas military airwings were quick to procure the Sea Otter following the end of the war, often purchasing via the British government. Eight aircraft were procured by the Royal Danish Air Force, while another eight were supplied to the Dutch Naval Aviation Service. The colonial service of France also purchased six Sea Otters, which were operated in French Indochina.

Variants
Sea Otter Mk I
 Reconnaissance and communications amphibian aircraft.
Sea Otter Mk II
 Air Sea Rescue amphibian aircraft.

Operators

Royal Australian Navy
No. 723 Squadron RAN received three Sea Otters in 1948, operating them until 1953.

Royal Danish Air Force

Royal Egyptian Air Force

Aeronavale
Troupes Coloniales operated six ex-RAF aircraft in Indochina between 1947 and 1952.

Royal Netherlands Navy
Dutch Naval Aviation Service including ASR duty aboard the light carrier Karel Doorman (R81)

Royal Air Force 
No. 277 Squadron RAF
No. 278 Squadron RAF
No. 279 Squadron RAF
No. 281 Squadron RAF
No. 282 Squadron RAF
No. 292 Squadron RAF
No. 1350 Flight RAF
No. 1351 Flight RAF
No. 1352 Flight RAF
Marine Aircraft Experimental Establishment
Royal Navy 
700 Naval Air Squadron
712 Naval Air Squadron
716 Naval Air Squadron
721 Naval Air Squadron
723 Naval Air Squadron
728 Naval Air Squadron
729 Naval Air Squadron
733 Naval Air Squadron
740 Naval Air Squadron
742 Naval Air Squadron
744 Naval Air Squadron
771 Naval Air Squadron
772 Naval Air Squadron
778 Naval Air Squadron
781 Naval Air Squadron
799 Naval Air Squadron
810 Naval Air Squadron
1700 Naval Air Squadron
1701 Naval Air Squadron
1702 Naval Air Squadron
1703 Naval Air Squadron

Specifications (Sea Otter)

Survivors
No museum holds a complete aircraft. The Fleet Air Arm Museum (Australia) at Nowra, New South Wales, Australia, has the nose section of JN200, a Sea Otter which served with the Royal Australian Navy.

See also

References

Citations

Bibliography

 Andrews, C.F. and E.B. Morgan. Supermarine Aircraft Since 1914. London: Putnam, 1981. .
 Andrews, C.F. and E.B. Morgan. Supermarine Aircraft since 1914 (2nd ed.). London: Putnam, 1987. .
 Halley, James J. The Squadrons of the Royal Air Force. Tonbridge, Kent, UK: Air Britain (Historians) Ltd., 1980. .
 Kightly, James. "Database: Supermarine Sea Otter & Seagull". Aeroplane, Vol 50, No. 3, March 2022. pp. 115–129. .
 
 Sturtivant, Ray and Theo Ballance. The Squadrons of the Fleet Air Arm. Tonbridge, Kent, UK: Air Britain (Historians) Ltd., 1994. .

External links
 

1930s British military reconnaissance aircraft
Amphibious aircraft
Sea Otter
Single-engined tractor aircraft
Biplanes
Aircraft first flown in 1938